Blieckaspis priscillae is a pteraspidid heterostracan agnathan from the Middle Devonian of North America.

Blieckaspis priscillae was originally described by Robert Denison from incomplete remains from Late Emsian-aged marine strata in Water Canyon, Utah, as a member of the genus Protaspis, naming it after one Priscilla Turnbull.  As more, successively better preserved fossils were found, Denison later revised his findings and placed Protaspis priscillae into Pteraspis in 1970.

In 1984, Alain Blieck further revised P. priscillae's classification, and placed it tentatively into Errivaspis.  In 1996, after studying even better preserved material found in Late Emsian-aged strata of the Lost Burro Formation in Death Valley, California, Elliott & Ilyes erected a new genus, Blieckaspis, in honor of Blieck, for "P." priscillae.

References

Pteraspidiformes genera
Devonian jawless fish
Middle Devonian animals
Devonian animals of North America
Devonian fish of North America
Devonian California
Devonian geology of Utah
Death Valley National Park
Natural history of the Mojave Desert
Paleontology in California
Fossil taxa described in 1996